George Weedon (1734–1793) was an American soldier during the Revolutionary War from Fredericksburg, Colony of Virginia. He served as a brigadier general in the Continental Army and later in the Virginia militia. After the Revolutionary War ended he became an original member of the Society of the Cincinnati (Va.).

Weedon served as a lieutenant under George Washington in the French and Indian War, mainly assigned to garrison duty in western Virginia. After the war, he moved to Fredericksburg and opened a tavern. It was within Weedon's tavern that Thomas Jefferson in January 1777 wrote the Statute of Religious Freedom; the very first document of its kind to acknowledge government recognition of religious tolerance. In 1775, he was made a lieutenant colonel and second in command to Hugh Mercer.  They were tasked with creating the 3rd Virginia Regiment, Virginia Line, Continental Army. He was promoted to colonel in 1776 and succeeded Mercer in command of his regiment.  On Mercer's death at Princeton, Weedon was promoted to brigadier general in 1777 and again succeeded him. He fought in the Battles of Trenton, Brandywine, and Germantown. At Valley Forge, Weedon commanded a brigade in Nathanael Greene's division. His brigade included Stewart's 13th Pennsylvania Regiment along with the 2nd, 6th, 10th, and 14th Virginia regiments.

In 1778, he resigned after a dispute with the Congress over seniority.  He went home to Virginia to lead a brigade of the state's militia at the request of Governor Thomas Jefferson.  He led his militia unit in the Yorktown campaign, where his brigade successfully repelled the feared and infamous unit of Colonel Banastre Tarleton, thus closing the one means of British escape at Gloucester Point.

References

Yorktown Battlefield: Brigadier General George Weedon at National Park Service, retrieved September 7, 2014
George Weedon at George Washington's Mount Vernon, retrieved September 7, 2014
This Day in History: George Weedon is Promoted to Brigadier General at History.com, retrieved September 7, 2014

External link

1734 births
1793 deaths
Adjutants general of the United States Army
Continental Army generals
Continental Army officers from Virginia
People of Virginia in the French and Indian War
Military personnel from Fredericksburg, Virginia
Virginia militiamen in the American Revolution